Baron, later Count Nikolaus Esterházy de Galántha (Galanta, 8 April 1583Großhöflein, 11 September 1645) was the founder of the West-Hungarian noble House of Esterházy which became one of the grandest and most influential  aristocratic families of the Kingdom of Hungary.

Life
Nikolaus's parents were Protestants, and he himself followed them at first, but he subsequently became a Catholic and, along with Cardinal Pázmány, his most serious rival at court, became a pillar of Catholicism, both religiously and politically. At court, he opposed the two great Protestant champions of the period, Gabriel Bethlen and George I Rákóczi.

His political ideal was the consolidation of the House of Habsburg as a means towards freeing Hungary from domination by the Ottoman Empire, and the Habsburg noted him because of his zeal to that end. He himself, on one occasion (1623), defeated the Turks on the banks of the Nyitra.

His first marriage with Orsolya Dersffy made him immensely rich and brought him also the lordships of Munkács (today: Mukachevo, Ukraine) and Lánzsér-Lakompak (today: Landsee and Lackenbach in Austria). When he had to hand over Munkács in 1622 to Gabriel Bethlen because of the Peace of Nikolsburg, he was compensated by the Emperor with 2 new lordships, namely Fraknó (today: Forchtenstein, Austria) and Kismarton (today: Eisenstadt, Austria).

In 1625 he officiated in the coronation of the Emperor Ferdinand II, who made him Palatine of Hungary, the highest political function in the country. He also became Count of Fraknó and Knight in the Order of the Golden Fleece on 10 August 1626.

Nikolaus was also an accomplished writer.

Marriage and children 

He married in 1612 Baroness Orsolya Dersffy de Szerdahely (1583–1619) and they had:

István (1616–1641), died before his father. Had one daughter.
Krisztina (1617–1617).

After his first wife's death, he married in 1624 Baroness Krisztina Nyáry de Bedegh (1604–1641) and had: 
 Magdolna (1625–1627) 
 László (1626–1652), killed in at the Battle of Vezekény 
 Katalin, (1628–1630) 
 Anna Júlia (1630–1669), married Ferenc Nadasdy de Nádasd et Fogarasföld 
 Michael (1632–1633)
 Mária Krisztina (1634–1634) 
 Paul I Esterházy of Galántha (1635–1713), his successor
 Mária (1638–1684), married Count György Drugeth de Homonna
 Ferenc (1641–1683), had issue.

Notes

References
 
 Galántai gróf Eszterházy Miklós Magyarország nádora[Palatine of Hungary]1582-1626. Editor: László Szalay  . Press of Lauffer és Stolp, Pest, 1863-1870 I-III Volume] 
Péter Katalin: Esterházy Miklós. Magyar História - Életrajzok. Gondolat kiadó, Budapest, 1985 

|-
! colspan="3" style="background: #ACE777; color: #000000" | Hungarian nobility

1583 births
1645 deaths
Nikolaus
Counts of Hungary
Hungarian people of the Thirty Years' War
Knights of the Golden Fleece
Nikolaus
Palatines of Hungary
Judges royal
People from Galanta
Converts to Roman Catholicism
17th-century philanthropists